Payagpur is a Taluk of Janwar Rajput  dynasty Founded by Balrampur Royal Rajput Family.
Payagpur is a district subdivision known as a "block" and tehsil in the Bahraich district of Uttar Pradesh. Here is a pandawcarpet famous temple-named Bagheswarnath (Temple of God Shiva) and Baba Ram Prakash Temple, Mata Phoolamati Mata Temple also located in Tal Baghel region of Payagpur. Lale Miya Shrine is also situated in Talab Baghel region. Baghel Talab is a very large pond situated in Payagpur block of Bahraich district.

Location 
Tehsil Payagpur is part of the Bahraich district of Uttar Pradesh and it is a railway station on the Gonda – Bahraich meter gauge railway section.

Constituency 

Payagpur is a Vidhan Sabha constituency and comes under Kaiserganj Loksabha Constituency. The present Member of Parliament is Shri Brij Bhusan Saran Singh of bjp and Shri Shubhash Tripathi bjp

Member of assembly.

Education 

Payagpur block has 152 primary schools (standard I to V), 51 middle school (standard VI to VIII) schools, and four senior secondary (standard IX to XII) schools. The block also has one college named as Rajmata Lalli Kumari Mahavidyalya that offers undergraduate programs and is host to the District Institute of Education and Training (DIET, Bahraich district).

1) K.B.Inter College

2) Indira Memorial Public School

3) Ram Prakash Inter College

4) Saraswati Vivek Mandir

5) Rajmata Lalli Kumari Mahavidyalaya

6) Arun Memorial College

7) District Institute of Education and Training

Health 

Payagpur has one government hospital, i.e., community health center CHC located in the Kotbazar area and private hospitals.

Mohd Shamim khan Social worker and famous English teacher is the notable person in this area.

References 

Cities and towns in Bahraich district